These are the late night schedules on all three networks for each calendar season beginning September 1980. All times are Eastern/Pacific.

PBS is not included, as member television stations have local flexibility over most of their schedules and broadcast times for network shows may vary, CBS and ABC are not included on the weekend schedules (as the networks do not offer late night programs of any kind on weekends).

Talk/variety shows are highlighted in yellow, network news programs in gold, and local news & programs are highlighted in white background.

Monday-Friday

(*) renamed Tomorrow Coast to Coast in January

Saturday

Sunday

By network

ABC

Returning Series
ABC Late Night
Fridays
Nightline

Not returning from 1979 to 1980
The Iran Crisis: America Held Hostage

CBS

Returning Series
The CBS Late Movie

NBC

Returning Series
The Midnight Special
NBC Late Night Movie
Saturday Night Live '80
The Tomorrow Show / Tomorrow Coast to Coast
The Tonight Show Starring Johnny Carson

New Series
SCTV Network 90

United States late night network television schedules
1980 in American television
1981 in American television